Kulacha Chairin (born 16 November 1988) is a Thai professional racing cyclist, who currently rides for UCI Women's Continental Team .

References

External links
 

1988 births
Living people
Kulacha Chairin
Place of birth missing (living people)
Kulacha Chairin